Boghall Cricket Club Ground is a cricket ground in Linlithgow, Scotland.  The first recorded match held on the ground came in 1969 when West Lothian played Edinburgh Academicals.  Between 1995 and 1998 the ground hosted a number of touring teams in minor matches, which included matches against the Netherlands, Denmark and the touring Bangladeshis.  The ground held its first first-class match when Scotland played against Ireland in 1996.  Two further first-class matches were played there, one in 1998 when Scotland played Australia A, and another in 1999 when Scotland played South Africa Academy.  The ground held its first List A match when Scotland played Yorkshire in the 1998 Benson & Hedges Cup.  The following year Scotland played another List A match against the Nottinghamshire Cricket Board in the NatWest Trophy.  The third and to date final List A match played at the ground came in the 2002 Cheltenham & Gloucester Trophy against Dorset.  The ground is still used today by Linlithgow Cricket Club.

References

External links
Boghall Cricket Club Ground at ESPNcricinfo
Boghall Cricket Club Ground at CricketArchive

Cricket grounds in Scotland
Sports venues in West Lothian
Buildings and structures in West Lothian
Linlithgow